Ride Clear of Diablo is a 1954 American Technicolor Western film directed by Jesse Hibbs starring Audie Murphy, Dan Duryea, Susan Cabot and Abbe Lane. made for Universal Pictures. Cabot and Murphy had appeared in two films together previously.

Plot
Sheriff Fred Kenyon (Paul Birch) and lawyer Tom Meredith (William Pullen) conspire to have dance hall girl Kate (Abbe Lane) entertain the hired hands of the O'Mara ranch whilst the Sheriff and the lawyer rustle the O'Mara's stock. Tom shoots both the father and his teenage son to leave no witnesses.

Surviving son Clay (Audie Murphy), a railroad surveyor in Denver, is informed of their deaths and comes back to his home where the identity of the murderers is unknown. Clay is talked out of revenge by the town Reverend (Denver Pyle) but Clay makes his own inquiries to the sheriff and Tom. When Clay asks the sheriff if he can become his deputy in order to make an investigation, the sheriff at first refuses. Tom advises the sheriff that it would be a good idea with Clay sent on a false trail to arrest notorious gunslinger Whitey Kinkaid (Dan Duryea) in the town of Diablo. Kinkaid has no connection with the murders, but the corrupt pair plan that Kinkaid will kill the pesky Clay.

To everyone's surprise Clay out-draws Kinkaid, arrests him, thwarts Kinkaid's escape attempts, and successfully fights off an ambush from three men. Kinkaid, who spends his life by idling about, is bemused by the unstoppable Clay and watches him go after the real killers. At first, he does this for amusement, but gradually he realizes that the moral attitude of the much younger Clay is like a valuable lesson in living a worthwhile life. It is amusing to see how he accepts him finally as an exemplar. Kinkaid's identification goes so far as to sacrifice himself to save the younger hero's life in several gunfights, all in accordance with the fact, that he said that if ever he feels he's become "like a human being", he will shoot (meaning here, sacrifice) himself.

Cast
Audie Murphy as Clay O'Mara
Susan Cabot as Laurie Kenyon 
Dan Duryea as Whitey Kincade 
Abbe Lane as Kate 
Russell Johnson as Jed Ringer 
Paul Birch as Sheriff Fred Kenyon 
William Pullen as Tom Meredith 
Jack Elam as Tim Lowerie 
Denver Pyle as Reverend Moorehea

References

External links
Ride Clear of Diablo at Dan Duryea Central

Ride Clear of Diablo at TCMDB

1954 Western (genre) films
1954 films
American Western (genre) films
Audie Murphy
Films directed by Jesse Hibbs
Universal Pictures films
1950s English-language films
1950s American films